Albatros D.VIII was the Idflieg designation for the Albatros L.35 single seat fighter.

References

Biplanes
Single-engined tractor aircraft
1910s German fighter aircraft
Military aircraft of World War I
D.08